Rhinecliff is a hamlet and census-designated place (CDP) located along the Hudson River in the town of Rhinebeck in northern Dutchess County, New York, United States. As of the 2010 census, the population of Rhinecliff was 425.

History

Today’s Rhinecliff was founded by Europeans in 1686 as the town of Kipsbergen by five Dutchmen, among them Hendrikus and Jacobus Kip. They moved from Kingston on the west bank to live in the new settlement along the eastern shore of the Hudson. By this time England had already taken over New Netherland, the former Dutch colony that included Manhattan.

In 1849, under the influence of the Hudson River School of painters, the hamlet was renamed as "Rhinecliff". The name was taken from the original name of the Jones-Schermerhorn estate, now known as "Wyndcliffe".

Anna L. and Levi P. Morton, who owned the nearby Ellerslie estate, constructed and endowed the Morton Memorial Library in Rhinecliff in memory of their daughter Lena. It was dedicated as a library in 1908.

Geography
It is directly across the Hudson River from the city of Kingston. The closest river crossing is the Kingston–Rhinecliff Bridge (New York State Route 199),  to the north.

Rhinecliff is one of the oldest intact hamlets along the Hudson River and is listed in the National Register of Historic Places as a contributor to the Hudson River National Historic Landmark District.

Rhinecliff is also included in the Local Waterfront Redevelopment Program (LWRP). It is designated a Scenic Area of Statewide Significance (SASS), a contributor to the DEC Mid-Hudson Historic Shorelands Scenic District, a contributor to DEC Scenic Roads designations, and is in the Hudson River National Heritage Corridor. The hamlet serves as the water and rail gateway to the larger Town of Rhinebeck.

The hamlet is demarcated by large agricultural and wooded area to the north, east, and south, and bounded by the Hudson River on the west. Steep topography, formed by contorted slate ridges and valleys, define the site-specific and seemingly random orientation of the small, frame nineteenth-century houses and winding narrow roads. The hamlet had a mid-nineteenth century building boom, but its boundaries and building density have changed very little over the last one hundred years.

Demographics

Government
As part of the town of Rhinebeck, the hamlet of Rhinecliff is included within the jurisdiction of the town government. 

A  proposal to build a large contemporary residence overlooking the Hudson on Grinnell Street in the hamlet is generating controversy in Rhinecliff. Several Rhinecliff residents have spoken out against the proposal, objecting to the size of the proposed residence, its modern style, and that it blocks views of the Hudson River and Catskill Mountains. Other Rhinecliff residents have defended the proposal, arguing it will be a beautiful addition to the hamlet and that it blends the historic and the modern in a creative way. In 2014 the matter was before the Rhinebeck Planning Board and Zoning Board of Appeals.

In culture
According to her biographer Louis Auchincloss, Edith Wharton was a frequent childhood visitor who later described the Wyndcliffe mansion as "The Willows" in Hudson River Bracketed. In her autobiography, A Backward Glance (1933), Mrs. Wharton wrote about Wyndcliffe and her aunt.

Notable people
Nearby notables, past and/or present, have included Levi P. Morton, Vincent Astor, Natalie Merchant, and Annie Leibovitz.

See also
 Morton Memorial Library (Rhinecliff, New York)
 Rhinecliff–Kingston (Amtrak station)

Notes

External links 

 Morton Memorial Library and Community House
 Rhinecliff.org, local community website

Hamlets in New York (state)
New York (state) populated places on the Hudson River
Rhinebeck, New York
Poughkeepsie–Newburgh–Middletown metropolitan area
Census-designated places in Dutchess County, New York
Census-designated places in New York (state)
Hamlets in Dutchess County, New York